Porridge is a 1979 British comedy film based on the television series Porridge. It was released under the title Doing Time in the United States. Most of Prison Officers and inmates from the original series appear in the film, with the notable exceptions of Lukewarm, Blanco, Heslop and Harris. There is also a different governor, played by Geoffrey Bayldon rather than series regular Michael Barrington.

The film, set a year before the final episode of the TV series, includes one of the last appearances by Richard Beckinsale, the actor who played Godber. He died in March 1979, a few weeks after its completion.

Plot
Slade prison has two new inmates: Rudge, a first offender, and Oakes (Barrie Rutter), an armed robber. Oakes approaches the prison's 'Mr Big', (Genial) Harry Grout (Peter Vaughan), and using a cut from his last job before being caught, asks for his escape to be arranged. Grout sets the price, then begins making arrangements.

Grout starts by forcing Fletcher (Ronnie Barker) to persuade the prison Governor to allow an inmates-versus-celebrities football match, to boost prisoner morale and 'put Slade on the map'. Fletcher successfully manipulates new prison officer Mr Beale (Christopher Godwin) to make the suggestion to Senior Officer Mr Mackay (Fulton Mackay), who approaches the governor and is approved, although all three claim the idea was theirs alone. Fletcher then becomes the prison team's manager and Grout next insists that Oakes be on the team.

The celebrity team arrive in a coach. The prisoners are notably underwhelmed when it is explained that their hopes for one of The Goodies on the team have not been met, the nearest they have to a famous face being a weather presenter from Anglia Television (Duncan Preston). During the match, Oakes feigns an injury and is taken to the changing rooms where he meets the coach driver, revealed as an accomplice. They exchange clothes and Oakes ties the coach driver up to throw off any suspicion. Shortly afterwards, Godber (Richard Beckinsale) is concussed on the field so Fletcher takes him to the changing rooms, where he sees the ruse unfolding. Taking no chances, Oakes, now disguised as the coach driver, forces Fletcher and a dazed Godber into the coach's luggage compartment at gunpoint then drives out of the prison under the guise of topping up the fuel.

Out into the country, Oakes meets further accomplices and they drive Fletcher and Godber away in another vehicle. Meanwhile, the prison officers have discovered the escape and the police and the Home Office are informed, both searching for the coach, though the prison officers' attempt to help isn't well met with police, as no one can explain how they let three inmates drive out of the gates. Fletcher tells Oakes that they don't want to escape as he and Godber only have a short time left to serve, and that they won't tell anyone about Oakes's plan because it's 'Them and Us'.

Oakes relents and releases them and they find a barn to hide in and catch their breath. They help themselves to some apples.  Fletcher explains to Godber that there is no possible way that being caught outside ends well for them, as any policeman they approach will claim the find for himself. Furthermore, he realises that once the Governor, Mackay and Beale start passing the idea of the match back down the line, it'll end up with Fletcher looking like the responsible one and he'll serve more time, meaning the only solution is to break back into prison.

Making their way through fields and villages, they steal a sexton's bicycle, and manage to sneak back into the coach just as the police let the prison officers take it back to the prison. Once inside the prison walls, both convicts slip out of the coach and smuggle themselves into the prison officers' club storeroom, where Fletcher quickly consumes several bottles of alcohol to become inebriated enough to make their story pass: they stumbled on Oakes tying up the bus driver and he forced them down the delivery hatch, where they claim to have been since.

The story is believed by all, and life seems to return to normal. As the other inmates question Fletcher on what really happened, Grouty subtly tells him that he will be rewarded for his efforts and keeping his mouth shut. Later in their cell, Godber laments that Oakes got away, though Fletcher assures him that it won't matter: Oakes will hate being on the run. Fletcher reminds Godber that in a few months, he'll leave prison as well: the difference being he'll be free and clear.

Mr Mackay visits them and tells them that, while the Governor believes they have been locked in the storeroom all day, it doesn't explain the mysterious UFO Sightings in the village (Unidentified Fleeing Objects), and the various happenings they created on their journey. Realising he will never be believed, Mackay tells them that he will always be watching, and that his day will come.  Fletcher and Godber cheekily munch on the stolen apples.

Cast

 Ronnie Barker as Norman Stanley Fletcher
 Richard Beckinsale as Lennie Godber
 Fulton Mackay as Mackay
 Brian Wilde as Barrowclough
 Peter Vaughan as Grouty
 Geoffrey Bayldon as Treadaway - Governor
 Christopher Godwin as Beal
 Barrie Rutter as Oakes
 Daniel Peacock as Rudge
 Sam Kelly as Warren
 Julian Holloway as Bainbridge
 Ken Jones as Ives
 Philip Locke as Banyard
 John Barrett as Hedley
 Gorden Kaye as Dines (coach driver)
 Karl Howman as Urquhart
 Derek Deadman as Cooper
 Tony Osoba as McClaren
 Oliver Smith as McMillan
 Zoot Money as Lotterby
 Duncan Preston as the Weatherman
 Jackie Pallo Jr as Jacko

Production
Unlike the television episodes, the film is not a BBC production and although there is a line that mentions the escape unfolding on the BBC, there are no references to the corporation on the DVD release (2003). Instead, the DVD was produced by ITV Studios. In order for the rights to be granted to ITC Entertainment for the production, an agreement was reached that the BBC would have the initial television rights to the movie. It made its TV premiere on New Year's Eve 1982, as part of the Corporation's Christmas & New Year line-up

The budget for the film was £250,000 and it was backed by Lew Grade's company ITC Entertainment. It was shot mainly on location at Chelmsford Prison, Essex, which was unoccupied at the time because it was being refurbished after a fire in one of the wings. The escape sequence was filmed in Buckinghamshire and Boxley, Kent. There is also a brief shot of the gates of Maidstone Prison. Sets were constructed for some cell and kitchen scenes.

Most of the filming took place in freezing conditions in January 1979. The resulting delays to the filming schedule meant that the part written for Tony Osoba had to be reduced because he had a commitment to appear in Charles Endell Esquire and his lines were given to other actors.

Music
The opening credits of the film feature the hit "Without You" by Nilsson and "Hit Me with Your Rhythm Stick" by Ian Dury and the Blockheads. The closing credits contain a more upbeat song by Joe Brown, entitled "Free Inside".

Reception
The film was one of the more popular of 1979 at the British box office, grossing more than £16 million in the UK.

See also
 List of films based on British sitcoms

References

External links
 
 
 
 

1979 films
1970s crime comedy films
1970s prison films
British crime comedy films
British prison films
Films based on television series
Prison comedy films
Television series by Fremantle (company)
Television series by ITV Studios
Films with screenplays by Dick Clement
Films directed by Dick Clement
Films with screenplays by Ian La Frenais
1979 comedy films
1970s English-language films
1970s British films